Nebraska State Normal School may refer to:

 Peru State College, Peru, Nebraska, known as Nebraska State Normal School, 1867–1921
 University of Nebraska at Kearney, Kearney, Nebraska, known as Nebraska State Normal School at Kearney, 1905–1921
 Wayne State College, Wayne, Nebraska, known as State Normal School, 1910–1921, and as State Normal School and Teacher's College, 1921–1949
 Chadron State College, Chadron, Nebraska, known as Nebraska State Normal School, 1911–1921